The Wiener Hofmusikkapelle is the group of musicians serving at the court chapel in Vienna. It was founded in 1498 under Maximilian I, Holy Roman Emperor. It was disbanded in 1922 and was the forerunner of the Vienna Boys' Choir.

History 
Prior to Maximillian I taking control of Tyrol, there was already a choir, with the organist Paul Hofhaimer and the composer and singer Pierre de la Rue at the Grande chapelle in Vienna, the musical establishment of the Burgundian-Habsburg court. Maximilian conquered the territory in 1490 and entered Vienna but he did not set up his court there until 1498. This was the year the Hofmusikkapelle was founded; Jurij Slatkonja was a chaplain and cantor at the court in Vienna and also the canon and provost of the Diocese of Ljubljana. Besides the singing master, two bass players and six boys were employed.

Under Emperor Ferdinand I most of the musicians of the Hofmusikkapelle were Flemish and under Ferdinand II most came from Italy. The court band flourished under the subsequent emperors until about 1740, after which Maria Theresa and Joseph II restricted its use to church music, and Antonio Salieri, who taught Beethoven, was the last Italian court conductor.

After World War I and the fall of the monarchy, the court music band was placed under the Ministry of Education. Boys were no longer hired and ladies of the Vienna State Opera sang the upper parts, and the choir was disbanded in 1922. However it was formed again in 1924 as the Vienna Boys' Choir, and this has since become a professional music group.

Wiener Hofburgkapelle
	
A chapel was built in Vienna in around 1287 by Albert I in the late Romanesque style. It was expanded under Albert II between 1423 and 1426, and rebuilt in Gothic style by Frederick III from 1447 to 1449. Later Maria Theresa arranged for it to be rebuilt in late Baroque style. It was in this building that the Hofkapelle performed, a tradition that has been continued. Today's Wiener Hofmusikkapelle consists of the Vienna Boys' Choir, male singers from the choir of the Vienna State Opera, and members of the Vienna Philharmonic. They regularly perform in church services at the Hofburgkapelle.

Bibliography
 Wien. Artikel in: MGG, Sachteil Bd. 9, Sp. 2004–2013 (1998).

References

External links 

 
 

1498 establishments in Europe
Culture in Vienna
Austrian orchestras
Hofburg
Vienna Philharmonic
Organisations based in Vienna